Chi Jian (269 – 8 October 339), courtesy name Daohui, was a Chinese military general of the Jin dynasty (266–420).  During the time of the Disaster of Yongjia, he led the refugees from his hometown to Yanzhou in 312 to escape the chaos in the north. They later fled to the south as Later Zhao were close to conquering the province. Under the Eastern Jin dynasty, Chi Jian became an important leading figure, standing with the likes of Wen Jiao and Tao Kan who greatly contributed to the dynasty's survival during the rebellions of Wang Dun and Su Jun. His name can be rendered as Xi Jian.

Early career 
Chi Jian was from Gaoping County (高平縣; northwest of present-day Weishan County, Shandong) and was very poor in his youth. His great-grandfather was Chi Lü, an official under the Han dynasty warlord Cao Cao. Chi Jian was determined to better his livelihood, so he began reading the scriptures and whenever he farmed, he would chant what he had learnt. Eventually, he landed an office serving under the Prince of Zhao, Sima Lun. However, he disliked the prince's growing imperial ambition and soon resigned. 

When Sima Lun usurped the throne in 301, Chi Jian refused to return to his service despite offers of lofty titles. The same year, Sima Lun would be killed, and Chi Jian returned to the government to serve Liu Shi (劉寔). A few years later, Chi Jian received respective offers from the Prince of Donghai, Sima Yue, and Yue's general, Gou Xi, to serve under them. Chi Jian refused both of them, sensing that the two men will soon be turning on one another. Eventually, Chi Jian decided to retire from the government.

Disaster of Yongjia and as Inspector of Yanzhou 
In 311, the barbarian forces of Han Zhao took over Luoyang and captured the emperor. Meanwhile, Chi Jian was captured by Chen Wu (陳午) of the Qihuo. Chen Wu wanted to employ Chi Jian and make him their leader, but Chi managed to escape. After Chen Wu was defeated, Chi Jian returned to his hometown in Gaoping, where most of the inhabitants were desperate to escape the ongoing war in the north. Chi Jian became a refugee leader because of this and led his followers fled to Mount Yi in 313, where they defended themselves from enemies.

The Prince of Langya and Jin's paramount prince in the south, Sima Rui, came into contact with Chi Jian, who he appointed Inspector of Yanzhou. Chi Jian remained at Mount Yi, surviving constant attacks from Shi Le and Xu Kan. However, with no aid from the capital as well as an ongoing famine around his domain, his people were beginning to feel overwhelmed. Chi Jian's followers still grew, as many refugees flocked over to him and lived on mice and swallows, but this only meant that more food was needed to keep the refugees fed. In the end, Chi Jian eventually retreated to Hefei with his followers in 322 as Later Zhao forces engulfed the region. Despite his setback, Chi Jian was commended by many for his virtuous character, and was appointed a Master of Writing in the government.

Wang Dun's Rebellion 
By the time Chi Jian moved southwards, Sima Rui (who ascended the throne in 318 as Emperor Yuan of Jin) had just been defeated by his general Wang Dun, who placed Jin under his control. Sima Rui grew ill from this and died the following year, leaving the throne to his son, Emperor Ming of Jin. Emperor Ming wanted someone to challenge Wang Dun within the state, so he made Chi Jian the Inspector of Yanzhou and Chief Controller of north of the Yangzi. However, Wang Dun saw through this and instead petitioned to have Chi Jian made Prefect of the Masters of Writing instead. Later that year, Emperor Ming summoned Chi Jian to the capital. 

On the way, Chi Jian visited Wang Dun's base, where they discussed the old court in the north. Wang Dun criticized the minister Yue Guang for his lack of talent while praising his counterpart Man Fen (滿奮). Chi Jian defended Yue Guang, saying that he had been a loyal man who tried to protect the Crown Prince Sima Yu while Man Fen betrayed him to Sima Lun. Wang Dun responded to him that Man Fen only did so under pressure, and Chi Jian replied that a real man remains true to himself in both life and death. Wang Dun was offended by this implied insult, and apprehended Chi Jian in his house for some time. He eventually released him to continue his way to Jiankang, despite his advisors' urge to kill him. When Chi Jian reached Jiankang, he began plotting with Emperor Ming against Wang Dun.

In 324, Emperor Ming was ready to campaign against Wang Dun. Chi Jian turned down the appointments Emperor Ming gave to him and instead advised him to reach out to Su Jun and Liu Xia (劉遐) to join his war against Wang Dun. Emperor Ming defeated Wang Dun's forces the same year, and Wang Dun died from natural causes before the war ended. Chi Jian told Emperor Ming that Wang Dun's remains should be given back to his family members to display himself as righteous. Later, Chi Jian called for Emperor Ming to execute Wang Dun's partisans on two occasions, but both times he found his suggestion rejected in favour of Wen Jiao and Wang Dun's advice respectively.

Su Jun's Rebellion 
Emperor Ming died at a young age in 325. He was succeeded by his child heir, Emperor Cheng of Jin, guided by his brother-in-law Yu Liang. Months prior to his death, he appointed Chi Jian as General of Chariots and Cavalry, Chief Controller of Xuzhou, Yanzhou, and Qingzhou, and Inspector of Yanzhou. After his death, Chi Jian held a series of important appointments for the next two years.

In 327, a rebellion broke out led by Su Jun and Zu Yue. Chi Jian offered to send reinforcements from Xuzhou to the capital, but Yu Liang turned him down. The capital was lost to rebel forces the following year and Su Jun became the de facto head of state with Emperor Cheng of Jin under his control. Yu Liang slipped away to Xunyang (尋陽, in present-day Huangmei County, Hubei) where he met Wen Jiao and conspired with him to reclaim the capital. He also got Chi Jian to join them, making him Minister of Works. 

Chi Jian proposed a strategy to Wen Jiao. There was a rumour that Su Jun was intending to bring the emperor east to Kuaiji. He told him that the loyalists should occupy strategic locations around the area and fortify them while scorching the fields. That way, when Su Jun arrives, it would be difficult for him to attack and there would be no rations for his army. Chi Jian led the eastern army over to Daye (大業, in present-day Suzhou, Jiangsu), Qu'a (曲阿縣; present-day Danyang, Jiangsu), and Chengting (庱亭, in present-day Wujin County, Jiangsu) where they set up barricades to weaken Su Jun's assaults.

Surely enough, Su Jun arrived at Daye on his way to Kuaiji, where he besieged the commander Guo Mo. As fighting intensified in Daye, Guo Mo secretly abandoned his men and left them to fend Su Jun off by themselves. Chi Jian's generals were alarmed, and his advisor Cao Na (曹納) told him that they should fall back to Guangling. Chi Jian, however, wanted to hold on to his defences and scolded Cao Na for recommending him to retreat. Fortunately for Chi Jian's group, loyalist forces led by Tao Kan, Wen Jiao, Yu Liang and Zhao Yin (趙胤) eventually arrived at Su Jun's base in Shitou, diverting Su Jun's attention away from Daye. Su Jun was killed in battle at Shitou when facing Tao Kan.

Su Jun's brother, Su Yi (蘇逸), was chosen by the remnants of the rebels to be their new leader. The rebellion continued on into the next year, and Su Yi was killed while fleeing from the loyalist army approaching Shitou. Chi Jian provided the final blow to the rebellion as he sent his general Li Hong (李閎) to destroy Han Huang and the remaining rebels at Mount Pingling (平陵山, in present-day Liyang, Jiangsu). For his efforts, Chi Jian was made Palace Attendant, Minister of Works, and Duke of Nanchang County by Emperor Cheng.

After Su Jun's Rebellion 
Chi Jian lived for another decade, serving the Jin dynasty diligently. In the beginning of 331, Chi Jian repelled a Later Zhao invasion in Lou County (婁縣; in present-day Kunshan, Jiangsu) led by Liu Zheng. Later in 335, he sent his general Chen Guang (陳光) to defend Jiankang from a Later Zhao invasion, although the invasion proved to be a false flag. In 338, he would receive his highest position yet as Grand Commandant.

Between 338 and 339, Chi Jian found himself as an opposition to Yu Liang's attempts at drastic measures. In 338, Yu Liang wanted to lead armies against Wang Dao as he believed that he was harbouring corruption in the government. Yu Liang invited Chi Jian to join him, but he soundly rejected it, so Yu Liang called off his plans. The next year, Yu Liang wanted to campaign against Later Zhao, even getting the approval of Wang Dao and Emperor Cheng at first, but Chi Jian convinced the Prime Minister and Emperor that Jin should be conserving their resources to strike at the right time. Once again, Yu Liang's plans were rejected, although Yu Liang later got his wish by the end of the year and attempted to invade Zhao, which ended in failure.

Chi Jian grew deathly ill in 339. He wrote a memorial of resignation to Liu Xia (劉遐), demanding that Cai Mo be the one to succeed his offices. Chi Jian soon died and was posthumously named as "Wencheng (文成)".

References 

 Fang, Xuanling (ed.) (648). Book of Jin (Jin Shu).
 Sima, Guang (1084). Zizhi Tongjian.

269 births
339 deaths
Jin dynasty (266–420) generals